Abacetus lautus is a species of ground beetle in the subfamily Pterostichinae. It was described by Peringuey in 1904.

References

lautus
Beetles described in 1904